Howard Rader (March 29, 1921 – February 2, 1991) was an American professional basketball player who played two seasons in the National Basketball League (NBL) and one season in the Basketball Association of America (BAA). During his first season in the NBL, he played alongside his brother Len Rader as members of the Tri-Cities Blackhawks. After his brother signed with the Hammond Calumet Buccaneers, Howie Rader stayed with the Blackhawks. In the BAA, he played for the Baltimore Bullets during the 1948–49 season. He attended Long Island University.

BAA career statistics

Regular season

References

External links

1921 births
1991 deaths
American men's basketball players
Jewish men's basketball players
Baltimore Bullets (1944–1954) players
Forwards (basketball)
Guards (basketball)
LIU Brooklyn Blackbirds men's basketball players
Philadelphia Sphas players
Tri-Cities Blackhawks players
20th-century American Jews